{{DISPLAYTITLE:(2R)-3-sulfolactate dehydrogenase (NADP+)}}

(2R)-3-sulfolactate dehydrogenase (NADP+) ((R)-sulfolactate:NADP+ oxidoreductase, L-sulfolactate dehydrogenase, (R)-sulfolactate dehydrogenase, ComC) is an enzyme with systematic name (2R)-3-sulfolactate:NADP+ oxidoreductase. This enzyme catalyses the following chemical reaction

 (2R)-3-sulfolactate + NADP+  3-sulfopyruvate + NADPH + H+

The enzyme from the bacterium Chromohalobacter salexigens can only utilize NADP+.

References

External links 
 

EC 1.1.1